Georgia's at-large congressional district special election, 1819 was called to fill a vacancy created when the former congressman was elected to the United States Senate.

Vacancy
At the time, Congressional terms began March 4, his resignation thus created a vacancy in the remainder of the 15th Congress as well as in the upcoming 16th Congress.

Election

Election results reported at the time appear to indicate that a single election was held for both vacancies in most counties of Georgia.  One newspaper reports two sets of returns for Richmond County, suggesting that that county may have been the only one that held separate ballots for both vacancies

Election result

Reid took his seat on February 18, 1819, near the end of the Second Session of the 15th Congress.

See also

List of special elections to the United States House of Representatives

Notes

Georgia 1819 At-large
Georgia 1819 At-large
Georgia 1819 At-large
1819 At-large
Georgia At-large
1819 Georgia (U.S. state) elections
United States House of Representatives 1819 at-large